The Acorn Stakes is an American Grade I race at Belmont Park in Elmont, New York for three-year-old Thoroughbred fillies. It is raced on dirt over a distance of one mile with a current purse of $500,000. It is the first leg of the US Triple Tiara and is followed by the Coaching Club American Oaks then the Alabama Stakes. The filly must win all three races to win the Triple Tiara, as well as the third leg of the "National" Triple Tiara (Kentucky Oaks and George E. Mitchell Stakes are the others).

The Acorn Stakes was run at Aqueduct Racetrack from 1960 to 1967 and 1969 to 1975. There were two divisions in 1951, 1970 and 1974. There was a dead heat for first place in 1954 and again in 1956.

Historic notes
The inaugural running of the Acorn Stakes took place on May 16, 1931 and was won by Baba Kenney. The filly was owned by Edward R. Bradley and trained by future U.S. Racing Hall of Fame inductee, Herbert J. Thompson.

Gallorette won the 1945 running of the Acorn and went on to earn American Champion Older Female Horse honors in 1946 and a career that would see her induction into the U. S. Racing Hall of Fame in 1962.

Ruffian, the ill-fated future Hall of Fame inductee, got her eighth straight career win in the 1975 edition of the Acorn. She did it in a new stakes record time, continuing her streak of either beating or equaling the record in every one of her major race victories, those being the Fashion, Astoria, Sorority and the Spinaway Stakes.

Riding her father's filly Mom's Command, in 1985 Abigail Fuller became the first female jockey to win the Acorn Stakes. It would be another 28 years before a female rider accomplished the feat when Rosie Napravnik won the 2013 edition aboard Midnight Lucky .

Records
Speed record:
 1:32.55 – Gamine (2020)

Most wins by an owner:
 6 – Calumet Farm (1941, 1943, 1944, 1956x2, 1979)
 5 – Wheatley Stable (1933, 1939, 1955, 1960, 1964)

Most wins by a jockey:
 5 – Eddie Arcaro (1945, 1946, 1948, 1955, 1961)
 5 – Mike E. Smith (1993, 1994, 1996, 1998, 2017)
 5 - John R. Velazquez (2000, 2007, 2008, 2015, 2020)

Winners

References

Horse races in New York (state)
Belmont Park
Flat horse races for three-year-old fillies
Triple Tiara of Thoroughbred Racing
Grade 1 stakes races in the United States
Graded stakes races in the United States
Recurring sporting events established in 1931
1931 establishments in New York (state)